Cheney Reservoir is a reservoir on the North Fork Ninnescah River in Reno, Kingman, and Sedgwick counties of Kansas in the United States. Built and managed by the U.S. Bureau of Reclamation for local water supply, it is also used for flood control and recreation. Cheney State Park is located on its shore.

History
The U.S. Bureau of Reclamation, and later the Arkansas-Red-White Basin Interagency Committee established in 1950, conducted studies on the Ninnescah River basin as part of an investigation of the broader Arkansas River basin. The investigation resulted in a water-use and control plan including the construction of reservoirs and the use of available water as a regulated supply for the city of Wichita, Kansas. Wichita needed an additional water supply to supplement its existing supply wells. The water of the Arkansas River was of poor quality and too polluted to use, leaving the Ninnescah as the next closest potential source. The Bureau of Reclamation issued a report in 1957, and the U.S. Congress authorized the construction of Cheney Dam and Reservoir in 1960.

Construction began in 1962 and finished in 1965. Storage of water in the reservoir began with the closure of the river outlet works in November 1964, and delivery of water to the city of Wichita began in the summer of 1965. Conservation storage of water increased until the reservoir was filled in October 1968.

Geography 
It lies in south-central Kansas in the Wellington Lowlands region of the Great Plains. Most of the reservoir lies in Reno County though its southwestern portion extends into Kingman County, and a small portion along the dam lies within Sedgwick County. The junction of the three counties' borders lies in the reservoir.

The reservoir is impounded at its southeastern end by Cheney Dam (National ID # KS00017). The middle portion of Cheney Dam lies in the northwest corner of Sedgwick County, its southwestern end lies in Kingman County, and its northeastern end lies in Reno County. The North Fork Ninnescah River is both the reservoir's primary inflow from the northwest and its outflow to the southeast.

Kansas Highway 251, which runs north-south, connects the reservoir to U.S. Route 54  to the south and the community of Cheney  to the south. Below the dam, the highway becomes a paved county road and turns northeast, running parallel to the dam then finally turning east. 21st Street North, another paved county road, runs east-west immediately south of the dam.

Hydrography
The surface area, surface elevation, and water volume of the reservoir fluctuate based on inflow and local climatic conditions. In terms of capacity, the Bureau of Reclamation vertically divides the reservoir into a set of pools based on volume and water level, and it considers the reservoir full when filled to the capacity of its active conservation pool.

Infrastructure
Its upstream face is covered with soil cement while its downstream face consists of a  layer of topsoil and grass. It has an uncontrolled spillway that leads to a conduit and stilling basin as well as two sets of outlet works:  one for the river and one for Wichita's municipal water supply.

Management
The U.S. Bureau of Reclamation owns and operates the dam and reservoir for flood control and municipal water supply purposes as part of its Wichita Project. The City of Wichita operates a pumping facility below the dam which pipes water to a treatment plant in the city. The Kansas Department of Wildlife, Parks and Tourism (KDWP) manages  of land around the reservoir as the Cheney Wildlife Area.

Parks and recreation
The KDWP operates Cheney State Park located on both shores of the reservoir's southern end. The  park is divided into two areas:  the East Shore Area and the West Shore Area. Both areas include boat ramps, campgrounds, and swimming beaches. The East Shore Area also hosts a full-service marina, and the West Shore Area includes hiking trails as well as the Ninnescah Sailing Center.

Cheney Reservoir is open for sport fishing year-round. Hunting is permitted on the public land around the reservoir although it is restricted in certain areas. In addition, certified range officers operate the Cheney Shooting Range on weekends at the north end of the Cheney Wildlife Area.

Wildlife
Fish species resident in the reservoir include channel catfish, crappie, striped bass, walleye, white bass, and wiper. Two invasive species, the white perch and the zebra mussel, live in the lake as well. Game animals living around the reservoir include doves, pheasants, quail, rabbits, and wild turkeys. Other land animals in the area include beavers, bobcats, muskrats, opossums, raccoons, red foxes, and skunks.

Information technology
In 2016, geolocation company MaxMind announced that its default locations for various countries would be manually changed to point to bodies of water instead of pointing to places on land; this included setting the middle of Cheney Reservoir as the default location for the United States. MaxMind's default locations are placed near the geographic centers of their respective countries, and are the coordinates that MaxMind's online geolocation service provides whenever it's queried for an IP address where it can only determine the country of origin. Before the 2016 change, MaxMind's default location for the United States was a farmhouse in nearby Potwin, but this caused significant legal trouble for its residents due to various people and organizations assuming that the farmhouse was the actual source of certain malicious IP addresses.

See also
 Lake Afton, southeast of Cheney Reservoir
 List of Kansas state parks
 List of lakes, reservoirs, and dams in Kansas
 List of rivers of Kansas

References

External links
Official
 Cheney Dam, U.S. Bureau of Reclamation
 Cheney State Park, Kansas Department of Wildlife, Parks and Tourism
 Cheney Wildlife Area, Kansas Department of Wildlife, Parks and Tourism
 Wichita Project, U.S. Bureau of Reclamation
Maps
 Kingman County Maps: Current, KDOT
 Reno County Maps: Current, KDOT
 Sedgwick County Maps: Current, Historic, KDOT

Dams in Kansas
Reservoirs in Kansas
United States Bureau of Reclamation dams
Buildings and structures in Kingman County, Kansas
Buildings and structures in Reno County, Kansas
Buildings and structures in Sedgwick County, Kansas
Earth-filled dams
Dams completed in 1965
Bodies of water of Kingman County, Kansas
Bodies of water of Reno County, Kansas
Bodies of water of Sedgwick County, Kansas